Hyloxalus leucophaeus is a species of frog in the family Dendrobatidae. It is endemic to a very limited range in Peru.

Description 
It is moderately sized, with a mostly moss grey body with patches of white and a more orange shade of the body colour.

Distribution 
This species is known only from a very small range Molinopampa district in the northern Cordillera Central in the Peruvian Andes where it has been found at an height of 2,400 m above sea level.

Habitat 
A marshy stream in a pasture of old farmland is the only place where this species was recorded.

Behaviour 
Like most, related species, their eggs are laid on land, but after hatching the tadpoles are moved to water.

References 

leucophaeus
Amphibians of Peru
Amphibians described in 2004